Jack Hodgson may refer to:

 Jack Hodgson (footballer) (born 1913), English footballer
 Jack Hodgson, a fictional forensic scientist in the television series Silent Witness

See also
 John Hodgson (disambiguation)